Chad Allen Morris (born December 4, 1968) is an American football coach. He is currently an offensive analyst at South Florida. Morris served as the head football coach at Southern Methodist University (SMU) from 2015 to 2017 and the University of Arkansas from 2018 to 2019.

Coaching career
Prior to his collegiate coaching career, he was a high school head coach in Texas for 16 seasons compiling a 169–38 record (.816 winning overall). Most recently he was the head coach of the Lake Travis High School football team from 2008 to 2009. He coached the team, starring quarterback Garrett Gilbert, to back-to-back 16–0, state title seasons.  Morris made the move to college in 2010 when he became the offensive coordinator and associate head coach at the University of Tulsa. He would spend only one season at Tulsa before moving to Clemson University as offensive coordinator. The 2 years prior to Morris' arrival, Clemson went a combined 15–12, including a record of 6–7 in 2010. Morris introduced a hurry-up, spread offense that helped Clemson to a 42–11 mark over the next four seasons. In December 2011, Morris became tied with Gus Malzahn as the highest paid assistant in college football after Clemson University gave Morris a six-year contract worth $1.3 million annually.

In December 2012, Morris interviewed for the Texas Tech head coaching vacancy, which had been created by the departure of Tommy Tuberville for Cincinnati. However, the job would be filled by Texas A&M offensive coordinator, and Texas Tech alumnus, Kliff Kingsbury.

SMU 
Morris got his first opportunity to head coach at the collegiate level when he became head coach at the Southern Methodist University on December 1, 2014.  Morris' first two classes of recruits at SMU were all from Texas high schools, making SMU the only school in the country with all-Texas recruiting classes during that time.  Morris completed his tenure at SMU compiling a 14–22 record over 3 seasons. Morris improved his record each year at SMU going 2–10 in 2015, 5–7 in 2016 and 7–5 in 2017.

Arkansas
On December 6, 2017, Morris was hired as the head coach of the Arkansas Razorbacks, signing a six-year, $21 million contract. In his first year, Morris led the Razorbacks to a 2–10 record, notching the team’s first ten-loss season in school history. This included a winless record in SEC play.

After a 2–8 start to the 2019 season and a 45–19 loss to Group of 5 opponent Western Kentucky, Arkansas dismissed Morris in his second season. All four of his wins as head coach were over Group of Five (Tulsa, Colorado State) or FCS (Eastern Illinois, Portland State) competition. To date, he is the only full-time Razorback coach to have left the school without a conference win. His 4-18 record is the worst record for a non-interim coach in Arkansas history.

Auburn

On December 10, 2019, it was announced Morris was hired by his longtime friend Gus Malzahn to serve as the offensive coordinator and quarterbacks coach for the Auburn Tigers.

On December 13, 2020, it was announced that Auburn head coach Malzahn was being fired, along with his entire staff (including Morris).

Personal life
Morris went to Edgewood High School in Edgewood, Texas, where he was the quarterback of the Bulldogs. He attended Texas A&M and earned a bachelor's degree in mathematics with a minor in statistics in 1992. Morris was atypical among NCAA Division I head football coaches in that he did not play football at the collegiate level. He was one of only four such coaches along with Sonny Dykes at TCU, David Cutcliffe at Duke, and Mike Leach at Mississippi State. He and his wife, Paula, have two children, a daughter, Mackenzie, and son, Chandler, who plays football at TCU.

Head coaching record

College

 * Departed SMU for Arkansas before bowl game

Notes

References

External links
 South Florida profile

Living people
1968 births
Arkansas Razorbacks football coaches
Auburn Tigers football coaches
Clemson Tigers football coaches
SMU Mustangs football coaches
South Florida Bulls football coaches
Tulsa Golden Hurricane football coaches
High school football coaches in Texas
Texas A&M University alumni
People from Edgewood, Texas
Coaches of American football from Texas